The Pilgrim Trust Lecture was a lecture supported by the Pilgrim Trust, organised by the Royal Society of London and the National Academy of Sciences. It was held between 1938 and 1945.

List of lecturers

References 

Royal Society lecture series
Lecture series
1938 establishments in the United Kingdom
1945 disestablishments in the United Kingdom
Recurring events established in 1938
Recurring events disestablished in 1945